Kim Young-hyun (born c. 1966) is a South Korean television screenwriter. She is best known for writing the hit dramas Dae Jang Geum and Queen Seondeok.

Filmography

As screenwriter
Dae Jang Geum (2003)
Ballad of Seodong (2005)
H.I.T (2007)
Queen Seondeok (2009)
Royal Family (2011)
Deep Rooted Tree (2011)
Six Flying Dragons (2015)
Arthdal Chronicles (2019)

As producer
Circle (2017)

Plagiarism

Awards

References

External links

1966 births
Living people
South Korean screenwriters
South Korean television writers
People involved in plagiarism controversies